Scandal Proof is a 1925 American silent drama film directed by Edmund Mortimer and written by Charles Kenyon. The film stars Shirley Mason, John Roche, Freeman Wood, Hazel Howell, Frances Raymond, and Ruth King. The film was released on May 31, 1925, by Fox Film Corporation.

Plot
As described in a film magazine review, Grace Whitney uses her inheritance to open up an Oriental shop, but the business is almost bankrupt. Monty Brandster comes in the shop and purchases an expensive jade necklace for Thelma Delores, who looks to be a gold digger. Monte invites Grace to a New Year's Eve party at his home, which proves to be a wild all night affair. After Monte is killed, Grace is held based upon circumstantial evidence. During the trial, when she is about to be convicted, she is saved by the testimony of a suitor, Herbert Wyckoff.

Cast

References

External links

Lobby card at www.gettyimages.com

1925 films
1920s English-language films
Silent American drama films
1925 drama films
Fox Film films
Films directed by Edmund Mortimer
American silent feature films
American black-and-white films
1920s American films